Fatmirë is an Albanian female given name. The name is a compound in Albanian of fat 'fortune, luck, destiny' + mirë 'good'. Fatmir is its male form.

People 
Notable people with the name include:
Fatmire Alushi (born 1988), German footballer

References

Albanian feminine given names